Frank Bosworth Brandegee (July 8, 1864October 14, 1924) was a United States representative and senator from Connecticut.

Early life
Frank Brandegee was born in New London, Connecticut, on July 8, 1864.  He was the son of Augustus Brandegee, who also served in the United States House.

He graduated from New London's Bulkeley High School in 1881.  He completed his degree at Yale College in 1885, where he was a member of Skull and Bones.  He studied law, and was admitted to the bar in 1888 and practiced in New London.

A Republican, in 1888 Brandegee served in the Connecticut House of Representatives, and was New London's Corporation Counsel from 1889 to 1893 and 1894 to 1897.

He returned to the Connecticut House in 1899 and served as Speaker.  He served again as New London's Corporation Counsel from 1901 to 1902 when he resigned because he had been elected to Congress.

U.S. House
Brandegee was elected as a Republican to the Fifty-seventh Congress to fill the vacancy caused by the death of Charles A. Russell.  He was reelected to the Fifty-eighth and Fifty-ninth Congresses and served from November 4, 1902, until May 10, 1905, when he resigned.

Brandegee was a delegate to several state and national Republican conventions, and was chairman of the Connecticut Republican Party's 1904 state convention.

U.S. Senate
Brandegee resigned from the House to accept election to the U.S. Senate, filling the vacancy caused by the death of Orville H. Platt.

He was reelected in 1908, 1914, and 1920, and served from May 10, 1905, until his death.

A staunch "Old Guard" conservative, Brandegee opposed women's suffrage and America's participation in the League of Nations.  In 1920 Brandegee was also one of the chief promoters of Warren G. Harding for President.

In the Senate he was Chairman of the following committees: Interoceanic Canals (Sixty-second Congress); Panama (Sixty-second Congress); Pacific Railroads (Sixty-third through Sixty-fifth Congresses); Library (Sixty-sixth and Sixty-seventh Congresses); and Judiciary (Sixty-eighth Congress).

Brandegee was President pro tempore during several sessions of the Senate in the Sixty-second Congress (1911 to 1913).

Death and burial
Brandegee never married and had no children.

He committed suicide in Washington, D.C. on October 14, 1924, inhaling fumes from a gas light in a seldom used bathroom on the third floor of his home.  According to published accounts, he was in ill health and had lost most of his fortune through bad investments.  Press reports at the time indicated that he left his chauffeur a suicide note and $100, with another $100 for two other household servants.

He was interred at Cedar Grove Cemetery in New London.

See also
List of United States Congress members who died in office (1900–49)

References

External links

Frank Brandegee at The Political Graveyard
U.S. Government Printing Office, Frank B. Brandegee: Memorial Addresses Delivered in the Senate and House of Representatives, 1925

1864 births
1924 suicides
Yale College alumni
Republican Party members of the Connecticut House of Representatives
Speakers of the Connecticut House of Representatives
Connecticut lawyers
American politicians who committed suicide
Suicides in Washington, D.C.
Suicides by gas
Republican Party United States senators from Connecticut
Burials in Connecticut
Republican Party members of the United States House of Representatives from Connecticut
Presidents pro tempore of the United States Senate
19th-century American lawyers